Saint George on Horseback is an oil painting by Mattia Preti painted in 1658. It is the altarpiece of the Chapel of the Langue of Aragon in St. John's Co-Cathedral, Valletta, Malta. The painting was Preti's first work in Malta, and it is regarded as one of his masterpieces and one of the best examples of  art.

Description
The painting is an oil on canvas with dimensions of 275 x 207 centimeters.
It is found in the Chapel of the Langue of Aragon in St. John's Co-Cathedral, in Valletta.

Analysis
It is a large baroque image of Saint George, which serves as an altarpiece. It was commissioned by Grand Master Martin de Redin.

References

Sources
 

1658 paintings
Paintings by Mattia Preti
Paintings in Malta
Preti
Baroque paintings
Altarpieces
Paintings of dragons
Horses in art
Angels in art